Jochen Fraatz (born 14 May 1963 in Cuxhaven) is a former German handball player who competed in the 1984 Summer Olympics and in the 1992 Summer Olympics.

In 1984 he was a member of the West German handball team which won the silver medal. He played all six matches and scored twenty goals.

Eight years later he was part of the German team which finished tenth. He played all six matches and scored sixteen goals.

References
 

1963 births
Living people
German male handball players
Handball players at the 1984 Summer Olympics
Handball players at the 1992 Summer Olympics
Olympic handball players of West Germany
Olympic handball players of Germany
Olympic medalists in handball
People from Cuxhaven
Medalists at the 1984 Summer Olympics
Olympic silver medalists for West Germany
Sportspeople from Lower Saxony